The American Samoa national under-20 football team is the national U-20 team of American Samoa and is controlled by Football Federation American Samoa.

History

The American Samoa national under-20 football team took part in the OFC U-20 Championship tournament 4 times (1998, 2011, 2014 and 2016). The team has never won a game yet. A 1–1 draw against Papua New Guinea in 2014 has been their best result so far.
In 2011, the team scored 2 goals, the highest scoring at a tournament so far.

OFC
The OFC Under 20 Qualifying Tournament is a tournament held once every two years to decide the qualification spots for Oceania Football Confederation (OFC) and representatives at the FIFA U-20 World Cup.

Current squad
The following players were called up for the 2022 OFC U-19 Championship from 7 to 20 September 2022. Names in italics denote players who have been capped for the Senior team.

Caps and goals as of 14 September 2022 before the game against the Cook Islands.

Pre-Squad

Fixtures and Results

2016

2018

See also
 American Samoa national football team
 American Samoa national under-23 football team
 American Samoa national under-17 football team
 American Samoa women's national football team

References

External links
 

Football in American Samoa
under-20
Oceanian national under-20 association football teams